Windycroft is a Grade II* listed house in Hastings, East Sussex, England. It was built between 1883 and 1891 for Alex and Constantine Alexander Ionides, using the land from two previous properties.

History
In 1880, art collectors Alex and Constantine Alexander Ionides bought 15 High Wickham in Hastings, East Sussex, England. In 1882, they bought 14 High Wickham. Using the land from these neighbouring properties, they built Windycroft, a house for their relative Edward Dannreuther. The work started in 1883, and was completed in 1891. The house was constructed using red brick, and had a tiled roof. The balconies contained iron balustrades. The house was decorated with William Morris wallpaper designs, and William Arthur Smith Benson provided the lighting for the house.

In 1892, Alexander Constantine Ionides' widow Euterpe Sgouta died at Windycroft. Edward Dannreuther lived in the house until his death in 1905. In 1911, the house was badly damaged by a fire. The house was sold by the Dannreuther family in 1978. In 1976, the house became a Grade II* listed building.

References

External links
 Historic England

Grade II* listed buildings in East Sussex
Grade II* listed houses
Buildings and structures in Hastings
Houses completed in 1891
Houses in East Sussex